Gardner is a surname of English, Scottish and Irish origin. Most sources say it is an occupational surname that comes from the word "gardener". Other sources claim that it is derived from the old English words gar-dyn meaning "warrior", "one who bears arms". In Ireland, the surname is an anglicized form of the Gaelic Mac Gairnéir. Variants include Gardyner, Gardener, Gardenar, Gardinier, Gardiner, and Gardner; the last two are the most common today.

There is a tradition held by some of the descendants of William Gardiner (son of Benoni), son of George of Newport, that William won his crest at Acre in 1191, by chopping through the shoulder of a Saracen who was about to kill Richard Coeur de Lion or Richard the Lionheart, hence the Saracen's head on the coat of arms.

A 
Adam Gardner, American musician
Alexander Gardner (disambiguation)
Alexander Gardner (soldier) (1785–1877), American or Irish mercenary
Alexander Gardner (photographer) (1821–1882), American photographer
Alex Gardner (baseball) (1861–1921), Canadian baseball player
Alex Gardner (footballer) (1877–1952), Scottish footballer
Alex Gardner (born 1991), Scottish musician
Andrew Gardner (disambiguation)
Andrew Gardner (newsreader) (1932–1999), British television newsreader
Andrew Gardner (American football) (born 1986), American football player
Andy Gardner (footballer, born 1877), Scottish football forward active in the 1900s
Andy Gardner (footballer, born 1888), Scottish football centre half active in the 1910s
Andwele Gardner (born 1978), American R&B singer, rapper, songwriter and record producer
Anna Gardner (1816–1901), American abolitionist, poet, teacher
Anthony Gardner (born 1980), English footballer
Anthony L. Gardner (born 1963), American  diplomat
Antony Gardner (born 1927), British Labour Party MP
Archibald Gardner (1814–1902), pioneer of the American West, businessman, and millwright
Arthur Gardner (diplomat) (1889–1967), U.S. foreign diplomat
Arthur Gardner (producer) (born 1910), American film producer
Arthur Duncan Gardner (1884–1977), British scientist
Augustus Peabody Gardner (1865–1918), Representative from Massachusetts and son-in-law of Henry Cabot Lodge
Ava Gardner (1922–1990), American actress

B 
Berta Gardner (born 1954), member of the Alaska House of Representatives
Bertie Charles Gardner (1884–1973) President of the Bank of Montreal, Chancellor at McGill University 
Bill Gardner (politician) (born 1948), Secretary of State of New Hampshire
Billy Gardner (born 1927), American Major League baseball player and coach
Bob Gardner, American politician
Booth Gardner (1936–2013), Governor of Washington
Brett Gardner (born 1983), American baseball player
Brian Gardner, mastering engineer
Bunk Gardner, American rock saxophonist
Burgess Gardner (born 1936), American jazz composer, performer & artist
Burleigh B. Gardner (1902–1985), American anthropologists

C 
Catherine Gardner (born 1982), American actress
Carl Gardner (born 1928), American singer
Charles J. Gardner (1843–1901), American politician
Christine Gardner (21st century), American professor
Craig Shaw Gardner (born 1949), American author
Charles Austin Gardner (1896–1970), Western Australian botanist
Chris Gardner (born 1954), American businessman
Colin Gardner MBE (c. 1940–2010), English football official and philanthropist

D 
Dale Gardner (1948–2014), American astronaut
Daniel Gardner (1750–1805), British painter
Daniel Gardner (musician) (born 1980), Canadian electronic musician
Daniel Gardner (cyclist) (born 1996), British cyclist 
David Gardner (disambiguation)
David Gardner (cricketer) (born 1940), English cricketer
David Gardner (fiddler) (born 1968), Scottish fiddle performer, teacher, and judge
David Gardner (The Motley Fool), co-founder of The Motley Fool, established in 1993
David P. Gardner (born 1933), president of the University of California and also president of the University of Utah
Dave Gardner (ice hockey) (born 1952), retired Canadian ice hockey centre
Dave Gardner (basketball) (born 1964), British basketball player
Brother Dave Gardner (1926–1983), American comedian and singer
Derrick Gardner (born 1965), American jazz trumpeter
Derrick Gardner (American football) (born 1977), American football player
Don Gardner (1931–2018), American R&B singer-songwriter, drummer
Don Gardner (American football) (born 1997), American football player
Donald Stanley Gardner, American engineer
Donald Yetter Gardner (1913–2004), American songwriter
Dylan Gardner, Australian soccer football player for Socceroos

E 
Earle Gardner (1884–1943), American baseball player
Edith  Jordan Gardner (1877–1965), American educator
Edward Gardner (disambiguation)
Edward Joseph Gardner (1898–1950), American politician 
Ed Gardner (1901–1963), American actor, director & writer
Edward W. Gardner (1867–1932), American balkline and straight rail billiards champion
Edward Gardner (MP) (1912–2001), British  politician
Edward Gardner (conductor) (born 1974), British conductor
Ted Gardner (fl. 1990s), business manager
Edwin M. Gardner (1845–1935), American painter.
Eliza Ann Gardner (1831–1922), abolitionist and religious leader
Elizabeth Jane Gardner (1837–1922), American painter
English Gardner (born 1992), American track and field sprinter who specializes in the 100-meter dash.
Erle Stanley Gardner (1889–1970), American author
Ernest Arthur Gardner (1862–1939), English archaeologist

F 
Jelly Gardner Floyd Gardner (1895–1977), baseball player
Fay Webb-Gardner (1885–1969), First Lady of North Carolina
Floyd M. Gardner, author of Phaselock Techniques
Frances Gardner (1913–1989), English cardiologist
Frank Gardner (driver) (born 1942), Australian racing driver
Frank Gardner (journalist) (born 1961), British television journalist
Fred Gardner (activist), American activist
Fred Gardner (cricketer) (1922–1979), English cricketer
Frederick D. Gardner (1869–1933), Governor of Missouri
Freddy Gardner (1910–1950), British jazz and dance band musician

G 
Gavin F. Gardner (1848–1919), a founder of the Adelaide Stock Exchange
George Gardiner (settler) (1608/1615 - c. 1677) of Rhode Island
Geoffrey Robert Gardner (born 1960), Australian politician
George Gardner (disambiguation), several people
George Gardner (coach), American football and basketball coach
George Gardner (botanist) (1810–1849), Scottish naturalist
George Gardner (ice hockey) (1942–2006), Canadian goaltender
George Washington Gardner (1778–1838), whaleship captain, member of the Gardner whaling family
George Gardiner (boxer) (1877–1954), American boxer, also known as "George Gardner"
George Gardner (priest), English Anglican priest
George Gardiner (settler) (c. 1610–1677), a founding settler of Newport, Rhode Island, also known as "George Gardner"
Georgie Gardner (born 1965), Australian newsreader
Gerald Gardner (1884–1964), English occultist and founding father of Wicca
Gerald Gardner (mathematician) (1926–2009), American mathematician
Gerald Gardner (writer) (1929–2020), American screenwriter
Greg Gardner (born 1975), Canadian ice hockey player and coach
Guy Gardner (astronaut) (born 1948), American astronaut

H 
Harold Gardner (1898–2006), American World War I veteran
Harry Gardner (cricketer) (1890–1939), English cricketer and British Army officer
Heather B. (Gardner), American hip-hop artiste
Heidi Gardner (born 1983), American actress and comedian
Helen Gardner (critic) (1909–1986), English literary critic
Helen Gardner (art historian) (1878–1946), American art historian
Helen Gardner (actress) (1884–1968), American film actress
Henry J. Gardner (1819–1892), Governor of Massachusetts (1855–58)
Herb Gardner (1934–2003), American cartoonist, playwright and screenwriter
Hiram Gardner (1800–1874), NY lawyer and politician
Howard Gardner (born 1943), American psychologist
Hy Gardner (1908–1989), American columnist and television presenter

I 
Ian Gardner, Canadian boxer
Isabella Stewart Gardner (1840–1924), American art collector

J 
Jack Gardner (disambiguation), various persons
Jack Gardner (basketball) (1910–2000), college basketball coach
Jack Gardner (boxer), (1926–1978), British heavyweight boxer
Jack Gardner (general), general in the United States Army
Jack Gardner (musician) (1903–1957), American jazz musician
James Alan Gardner (born 1955), Canadian science fiction author
James Alton Gardner (1943–1966) Medal of Honor awardee, Vietnam War
James Knoll Gardner (1940–2017), American judge
Jane F. Gardner (born 1934), British academic
Jessica Gardner (born 1971), British librarian
Jimmy Gardner (disambiguation)
Jimmy Gardner (ice hockey) (1881–1940), Canadian professional ice hockey forward
Jimmy Gardner (boxer) (1885–1964), Irish-American boxer
Jimmy Gardner (actor) (1924–2010)
Joan Gardner (disambiguation)
Joan Gardner (British actress) (1914–1999), British actress
Joan Gardner (voice actress) (1926–1992), American actress
Joan Gardner (Broadway actress) (1903–?), Broadway actress and chorus girl
Joan Gardner (microbiologist) (1918–2013), Australian microbiologist
Joe C. Gardner (1944–2013), American politician
John Gardner (disambiguation)
John Gardner (American writer) (1933–1982), American novelist and educator, author of Grendel
John Gardner, Anglo-Indian actor
John Gardner (Australian politician), Australian Liberal Party MP for the South Australian seat of Morialta since 2010
John Gardner (boat builder) (1905–1995), American nautical historian
John Gardner (British writer) (1926–2007), British author of spy and mystery novels, official James Bond author
John Gardner (composer) (1917–2011), British composer
John Gardner (delegate), (1747–1808), U.S. farmer, Rhode Island delegate to Continental Congress
John Gardner (law) (born 1965), Professor of Jurisprudence, University of Oxford and Fellow of University College, Oxford, and Visiting Professor, Yale Law School, Yale University
John Gardner (minister) (1809–1899), Presbyterian minister in Australia
John Gardner (Rhode Island governor) (1697—1764) Deputy Governor, Colony of Rhode Island
John Gardner (Texas Ranger) ((1845—1926) US Texas Ranger, trail boss
John Albert Gardner (born 1979), American double murderer
John D. Gardner (general), Lieutenant General in the U.S. Army
John Dunn Gardner (1811–1903), British Member of Parliament, 1841 to 1847
John Fentress Gardner (1912–1998), American author and educator
John J. Gardner (1845–1921), American politician representing New Jersey in the United States House of Representatives, 1885 to 1893
John L. Gardner (boxer), British boxer, who beat Ossie Ocasio
John L. Gardner (brigadier general) (1793–1869), Colonel then Brigadier General in the US Army
John Lowell Gardner II (1837–1898), patron of the arts
John W. Gardner (1912–2002), U.S. Secretary of Health, Education, and Welfare during the Great Society, founder of Medicare and Public Broadcasting
Joseph Gardner (disambiguation)
Josh Gardner (soccer) (born 1982), American soccer player
Josh Gardner (comedian) (born 1971), American comedian and writer
Joshua Gardner (sea captain), British sea captain
Julian Gardner (poker player) (born 1978), English poker player
Julie Gardner (born 1969), Welsh television producer

K 
Katy Gardner, British novelist
Kay Gardner (composer) (1942–2002), musician and composer

L 
Larry Gardner (1886–1976), American Major League baseball player
Lauren Gardner (scientist), American epidemiologist
Laurence Gardner, British writer
 Lawrence Gardner (?–1850) British engineer and founder of L Gardner and Sons Ltd, now Gardner Marine Diesels
Lee Gardner, American baseball player
Lee Gardner (footballer), Scottish footballer
Leonard Gardner (born 1934), American writer
Lige Gardner, American gunfighter
Lisa Gardner, American author
Lloyd Gardner, American diplomatic historian

M 
Margaret Elizabeth Gardner (1875–1942), American political hostess
Mark Gardner (inventor) (born 1955), American inventor
Mark Gardner (baseball player) (born 1962), American baseball player
Mark Gardner (Australian rules footballer) (1884–?), Australian rules footballer
Martha M. Gardner, American statistician
Martin Gardner (1914–2010), American mathematics and science writer and magician
Matilda Hall Gardner (1871–1954), American suffragist
Maureen Gardner (1926–1974), British sprint hurdler
Meredith Gardner (1912–2002), American linguist and cryptographer
Mills Gardner (1830–1910), American attorney and politician

N 
Nathaniel Lyon Gardner (1864–1937), American botanist

O 
Obadiah Gardner (1852–1938), American politician
Oliver Max Gardner (1882–1947), Governor of North Carolina

P 
Paul Gardner (footballer) (born 1957), English footballer
Percy Gardner (1846–1937), English classical archaeologist
Philip John Gardner (1914–2003), English recipient of the Victoria Cross

R 
Racin Gardner (born 1972), American auto racing driver
Randy Gardner (disambiguation)
Randy Gardner (figure skater) (born 1958), American figure skater
Randy Gardner (politician) (born 1958), member of the Ohio House of Representatives
Ricardo Gardner (born 1978), Jamaican footballer
Rich Gardner (born 1981), American football cornerback
Richard Gardner (disambiguation)
Rita Gardner (1934–2022), American actress
Rob Gardner (musician), American rock drummer
Rob Gardner (baseball) (born 1944), baseball player
Robert Gardner (anthropologist) (born 1925), film director
Robert Gardner (footballer) (died 1887), Scottish footballer
Rod Gardner (born 1977), American football wide receiver
Ross Gardner (born 1985), English footballer
Roy Gardner (bank robber) (1884–1940), American outlaw
 Sir Roy Gardner (businessman) (born 1945), Chairman of Manchester United
Rulon Gardner (born 1971), American Greco-Roman wrestler

S 
Sam Gardner (soccer) (born 1997), Canadian soccer player
Sauce Gardner (born 2000), American football player
Scott Gardner, Australian writer
Sheldon Gardner (1934–2005), American psychologist
Stu Gardner, American musician and composer
Sue Gardner (born 1967), Executive Director of the Wikimedia Foundation
Sydney Gardner (1884–1965), Australian politician

T 
Teddy Gardner (1922–1977), English boxer of the 1930s, '40s and '50s
Thomas Gardner (disambiguation)
Thomas Gardner (1724–1775), American political figure and soldier
Thomas Gardner (planter) (1592–1674), American colonist
Thomas Gardner (basketball) (born 1985), American basketball player
Tommy Gardner (1910–1970), English footballer
Tom Gardner (born 1968), American financier
Tony Gardner (born 1964), English actor
Tony Gardner (designer) (born 1965), American makeup and special effects designer

V 
Virginia Gardner (born 1995), American actress

W 
Walter Everson Gardner (1873–1943), mine manager in Broken Hill, New South Wales
Wayne Gardner (born 1959), Australian racing motorcyclist
Wes Gardner (born 1961), American Major League baseball player
William Gardner (disambiguation) many people, including
William Gardner (Australian settler), (1802–1860) Australian colonial settler
William Gardner (Victoria Cross recipient) (1821–1897), Scottish recipient of the Victoria Cross
William Biscombe Gardner (1847–1919), English painter and engraver
William E. Gardner Jr. (1939–1991) president of Savannah State College 1989–1991

Fictional characters
Admiral Gardner, head of Starfleet in Star Trek: Enterprise
Amy Gardner, a character in The West Wing
Chauncey Gardner, Peter Sellers' character in Being There
Edward Gardner, a character in the 1997 French-American fantasy drama movie FairyTale: A True Story
Guy Gardner (comics), a DC Comics superhero
Joe Gardner, the protagonist of Disney/Pixar film Soul.
Sam Gardner and his descendants, the Gardner family in The Lord of the Rings
Téa Gardner, English name of Anzu Mazaki, a Yu-Gi-Oh! anime character

See also
Gaertner
Gardner (given name)
Gardner (disambiguation)
Gardiner (disambiguation)

References

English-language surnames
Occupational surnames
English-language occupational surnames